George Henry William (10 October 1897 – 22 February 1957) was an English professional footballer who played as an inside forward for Southampton and Exeter City in the 1920s.

Football career
Williams was born at Ventnor on the Isle of Wight; during the First World War he had been a member of the Hampshire Regiment, serving in the 2/4th Battalion.

After leaving the army, Williams joined Southampton as an amateur in 1919, signing as a professional in October 1920. He made his debut when he took the place of the injured Arthur Dominy for a Football League Division Three match at Swindon Town on 6 September 1920. Although Williams scored, the match ended in a 3–2 defeat. He retained his place for the next match, a 2–0 victory over local rivals, Portsmouth. Following Dominey's return to fitness, Williams was not given another opportunity in the first team and moved to Exeter City in the summer of 1921.

After one season with Exeter, in which he made eleven league appearances, Williams returned to Hampshire where he played Hampshire League football with Netley Sports and Cowes, before finishing his football career at Salisbury City.

Later career
After retiring from football, Williams found employment as a painter and decorator.

References

External links
Career details on www.11v11.com

1897 births
1957 deaths
Military personnel from the Isle of Wight
People from Ventnor
English footballers
Southampton F.C. players
Exeter City F.C. players
Cowes Sports F.C. players
Salisbury City F.C. (1905) players
English Football League players
Association football defenders
Royal Hampshire Regiment soldiers
British Army personnel of World War I